This was the sixth time India participating in the Commonwealth Games. India finished sixth in this competition.

Medalists

Gold Medalists

Silver Medalists

Bronze Medalists

References

Nations at the 1970 British Commonwealth Games
India at the Commonwealth Games
1970 in Indian sport